The Reverend Honourable Francis Sylvester Grimston (born 8 December 1822 at Gorhambury, Hertfordshire; died 28 October 1865 at Wakes-Colne, Essex) was an English amateur cricketer.

Career
Francis Grimston was educated at Harrow and Magdalene College, Cambridge.  At Cambridge, he was a member of the University Pitt Club.  As a cricketer, he was mainly associated with Cambridge University and Marylebone Cricket Club (MCC), making 18 known appearances in first-class matches from 1843 to 1851. He was a wicket-keeper.

He later became a clergyman, and was vicar of Wakes Colne from 1846 to 1865.

Family
Grimston was the sixth and youngest son of James Grimston, 1st Earl of Verulam.  Three of his brothers James, Edward and Robert all played first-class cricket, as did his nephews Walter Grimston and Lord Hyde.

References

External sources
 CricketArchive record

1822 births
1865 deaths
People educated at Harrow School
Alumni of Magdalene College, Cambridge
Presidents of the Cambridge Union
Cambridge University cricketers
English cricketers
English cricketers of 1826 to 1863
Marylebone Cricket Club cricketers
Younger sons of earls
Gentlemen of England cricketers